Louis Childs Usher (June 27, 1897 – January 1, 1927) was an American football player.  He played professionally as tackle, guard, and center in the National Football League (NFL) for five seasons with the Rochester Jeffersons, Chicago Bears, Hammond Pros, Kenosha Maroons, and Milwaukee Badgers.  Usher was killed on January 1, 1927, in an automobile accident near Calumet City, Illinois.

References

1897 births
1927 deaths
American football centers
American football guards
American football tackles
Chicago Bears players
Hammond Pros players
Kenosha Maroons players
Milwaukee Badgers players
Rochester Jeffersons players
Syracuse Orange football players
All-American college football players
Players of American football from Chicago
Road incident deaths in Illinois